
Shwesandaw Pagoda may refer to:
Shwesandaw Pagoda (Bagan)
Shwesandaw Pagoda (Pyay)
Shwesandaw Pagoda (Taungoo)
Shwesandaw Pagoda (Thandwe)
Shwesandaw Pagoda (Twante)